Sherwani, Shervani or Sarwani (Pashto شیروانی) is a Pashtun tribe primarily found in Afghanistan with a significant minority found in Balochistan,Khyber Pakhtunkhwa and Punjab, Pakistan. The Sarwani people originate from the city of Sherran or Current Iran-Afghan bordered Regions and from the Ghazni province.

See also
 Shirani (Pashtun tribe)
 Suri (Pashtun)
 Ghor Province

References

External links 
 Sarwani Pashtuns and the part played by them in history of India

Bettani Pashtun tribes
Pashto-language surnames
Saraiki-language surnames
Pakistani names